Ataabad may refer to:
 Ataabad, Fars
 Ataabad, Aqqala, Golestan Province
 Ataabad, Gonbad-e Qabus, Golestan Province